Zoran Filipović (born 6 February 1953) is a Montenegrin former football coach and player, best known for his playing stints with Red Star Belgrade and S.L. Benfica.

Club career
Filipović, born 6 February 1953, in Titograd, SR Montenegro, FPR Yugoslavia, made his name in Yugoslavia as a potent striker with Red Star Belgrade, during more than ten seasons at the club (5 June 1969 to 29 June 1980). He played a total of 520 games for the club scoring 302 goals. He was the Yugoslav First League top scorer in 1976–77 season with 21 goals. He also still holds the club record for most goals in European competitions – scoring 28 goals for Red Star in European Cup, Cup Winners' Cup and UEFA Cup.

His first stop abroad was a season at Club Brugge in Belgium, scoring eight goals in 21 league matches.
In the summer of 1981, 28-year-old Filipović joined the reigning Portuguese champions S.L. Benfica where over the following three seasons he scored 28 goals in 54 league matches. Zoran Filipović also guided the club Benfica to the 1983 UEFA Cup Final against R.S.C. Anderlecht, being the top scorer of that season's competition and scoring memorable goals for the Portuguese in the quarterfinal against A.S. Roma and in the semifinal against Universitatea Craiova.

Filipović ended his career with Boavista FC (1984–1986) when he became the assistant coach at the same club.

International career
Filipović made his debut for Yugoslavia in a May 1971 European Championship qualification match against East Germany in Leipzig, scoring a debut goal after only 11 minutes. He earned a total of 13 caps, scoring 2 goals and his final international was a November 1977 Balkan Cup match (0-0) against Greece in Thessaloniki.

Managerial career
Filipović got his first head coaching job at S.C. Salgueiros in 1988 and stayed with the club for five seasons. He orchestrated the club's most notable moments in history by becoming Second League champion in 1989–90 and achieving UEFA Cup participation through best placement in club's history immediately in the next season.
In 1993, he moved to S.C. Beira-Mar where he coached for a season. In 1994, he returned to S.L. Benfica for a two-year spell where he was the assistant coach and interim head coach winning one Portuguese Cup in 1996, and participating in the UEFA Champions League. During 1997 he coached Boavista.

From mid-1990s Zoran Filipović was on the FR Yugoslavia national team coaching staff as an assistant to head coach Slobodan Santrač. He was part of Yugoslav coaching staff at the World Cup 1998, leaving the post together with Santrač right after the tournament.
After joining as their head coach for a short spell, he left to work as part of Sampdoria coaching staff. Vujadin Boškov called him on to become his assistant during the second part of the 1998 season.

Zoran Filipović's next stop was Vitória S.C. in the Portuguese league.

However, Zoran Filipović re-joined the FR Yugoslavia national team in 1999 continuing his collaboration with Vujadin Boškov when he took over. Filipović was the assistant at the Euro 2000. Following Euro 2000, he briefly coached Panionios in Greece.
In 2001 Zoran Filipović returned to coach Red Star Belgrade in Serbia until 2003 with which he won the 2001–02 FR Yugoslavia Cup title and is remembered for launching young players such as Nemanja Vidić, Boško Janković, Nikola Žigić, Aleksandar Luković amongst others.
In 2003 Zoran Filipović went to the United Arab Emirates when coaching Al-Shaab with which he was defeated in the Cup finals.
After the Emirates experience, he became the technical director of the Football Association of Serbia and Montenegro A and u21 squads participating in the 2006 FIFA World Cup in Germany and the 2006 U21 European Championship in Portugal.

On 1 February 2007, he was appointed the first coach of the newly created Montenegro national team. His first game in charge was a friendly against Hungary on 24 March 2007 where they won their debut match with 2–1. The record in the newly formed Montenegro national team was more than positive for a team rated always as underdogs – of a total of 23 matches played, 8 victories were achieved, 8 draws and 7 defeats. The FA president Dejan Savićević commented when Zoran Filipović's contract expired in January 2010 – "Filipović did an enormously good job. He formed a great group of players and worked with great enthusiasm." Zoran Filipović left the Balkan newcomers in an astonishing 73rd position in the FIFA ranking when he departed from this historical role.
Only two months after leaving the helm of Montenegro national team he assumed a 3-month coaching job contract in Romanian club FC Ceahlăul Piatra Neamţ.

In July 2010 he was hired by South African club Golden Arrows from Durban.
With only three months left in the championship and with relegation imminent, Zoran Filipović arrived in FC Atyrau to save the team from relegation. He stayed on to sign a one-year contract for season 2012.

In May 2016 it was announced by Serbia that Zoran Filipović will return to national team football in a new role.

After five years in the Serbia where significant achievements were attained, in December 2020 accepted a new Challenge to become the National Team Coach of Libyan Football Federation. In May 2021 before the start of the qualifications for the Arab Cup in Qatar he terminated his contract with the Libyan Football Federation in FIFA with just cause.

Honours

Player
Red Star Belgrade
 Yugoslav First League: 1972–73, 1976–77, 1979–80
 Yugoslav Cup: 1970–71

Benfica
 Primeira Liga: 1982–83, 1983–84
 Taça de Portugal: 1982–83
 UEFA Cup: runner-up 1982–83

Manager
Benfica (as an assistant)
 Taça de Portugal: 1995–96

Salgueiros
 Portuguese Second Division: 1989–90

Red Star Belgrade
 FR Yugoslavia Cup: 2001–02

Individual
Yugoslav First League top scorer: 1976–77
UEFA Cup top scorer: 1982–83

Trivia
Zoran Filipović still has the goal record in European competitions for Red Star Belgrade – 28 goals.
Zoran Filipović is ranked the 3º Top goalscorer for Red Star – 502 games/302 goals.
Zoran Filipović in season 1982–83 he contributed to Benfica's European good campaign – 12 games/8 goals (hat trick against AS Roma, and also the decisive goal against Universitatea Craiova).

References

External links

1953 births
Living people
Footballers from Podgorica
Association football forwards
Yugoslav footballers
Yugoslavia under-21 international footballers
Yugoslavia international footballers
Red Star Belgrade footballers
Club Brugge KV players
S.L. Benfica footballers
Boavista F.C. players
Yugoslav First League players
Belgian Pro League players
Primeira Liga players
Yugoslav expatriate footballers
Expatriate footballers in Belgium
Yugoslav expatriate sportspeople in Belgium
Expatriate footballers in Portugal
Serbia and Montenegro football managers
S.C. Salgueiros managers
S.C. Beira-Mar managers
Boavista F.C. managers
Vitória S.C. managers
Panionios F.C. managers
Red Star Belgrade managers
Al-Shaab CSC managers
Serbia and Montenegro expatriate football managers
Expatriate football managers in Portugal
Expatriate football managers in Greece
Serbia and Montenegro expatriate sportspeople in Greece
Expatriate football managers in the United Arab Emirates
Serbia and Montenegro expatriate sportspeople in the United Arab Emirates
Montenegrin football managers
Montenegro national football team managers
CSM Ceahlăul Piatra Neamț managers
Lamontville Golden Arrows F.C. managers
FC Atyrau managers
Libya national football team managers
Montenegrin expatriate football managers
Expatriate football managers in Romania
Montenegrin expatriate sportspeople in Romania
Expatriate soccer managers in South Africa
Expatriate football managers in Kazakhstan
Montenegrin expatriate sportspeople in Kazakhstan
Association football coaches
Association football scouts
Yugoslav expatriate sportspeople in Portugal
Serbia and Montenegro expatriate sportspeople in Portugal
Serbia and Montenegro expatriate sportspeople in Italy